The Netball South Africa Challenge (previously known as the Diamond Challenge and currently known as the SPAR Challenge) is an international netball tournament held close to biannually in South Africa and organised by the country's governing body for the sport, Netball South Africa. The challenge is contested by the South African national team and up to five other African nations. The inaugural tournament was held in 2012 and it has been contested in most subsequent years.

History
The tournament has been held in different South African cities since it began in 2012. The South African team has won each of the tournaments on offer. The tournament did not take place in 2014 and 2017. Despite South Africa's dominance at the tournament, head coach Norma Plummer has stated "we respect all teams we play in the Diamond Challenge and we [work] hard to win these games confidently". In the 2016 and 2018 editions, an invitational second-tier side, known as the South African Presidents XII, has participated with a view to developing the "next tier" of South African netballers with international experience.

Results

See also

 Netball in Africa
 Netball in South Africa

Notes

References

External links
 2018 Tournament – Overview of the 2018 Challenge

Netball competitions in Africa
International netball competitions hosted by South Africa
2012 establishments in South Africa